Timur Kandi (also Romanized as Tīmūr Kandī; also known as Teymūr and Tīmūr) is a village in Aslan Duz Rural District, Aslan Duz District, Parsabad County, Ardabil Province, Iran. At the 2006 census, its population was 92, in 19 families.

References 

Towns and villages in Parsabad County